The 2018–19 Canberra Capitals season was the 35th season for the franchise in the Women's National Basketball League (WNBL). It saw the team's eighth premiership win.

Roster

Standings

Results

Regular season

Semi-finals

Grand Finals

Team Stats 

Source:

Signings

Returning

Incoming

Awards

Post-season

References

External links
Canberra Capitals Official website

2018–19 WNBL season
2018–19 in Australian basketball
Basketball,Canberra Capitals
Basketball,Canberra Capitals